McKinney v University of Guelph [1990] 3 SCR 229 is the Supreme Court of Canada case that decided that, for the purpose of determining the application of the Canadian Charter of Rights and Freedoms, universities were not part of government. Therefore, the mandatory retirement age for university teachers did not violate equality rights under section 15 of the Charter. In reaching this holding, the Court refined the scope of the Charter as it applies to government bodies as well as the definition of "law" within the ambit of the Charter.

Background
Three year prior to McKinney, the Court held in Retail, Wholesale and Department Store Union, Local 580 v Dolphin Delivery Ltd that the Charter only applied to the government but without defining what constitutes "government".

Eight professors and one librarian from the University of Guelph applied for declarations that the university's policy for mandatory retirement at age 65 as well as the Ontario Human Rights Code, which allowed such policies, were unconstitutional because it violated their section 15 Charter rights to equality.

The issues before the court were: 
1. whether the Canadian Charter of Rights and Freedoms applies to universities;
2.  if the Charter does apply to universities, whether mandatory retirement policies violate s. 15;
3.  whether the limitation of the prohibition against age discrimination in the Ontario Human Rights Code to persons between the ages of 18 and 65 violates s. 15; and
4. if the limitation does violate s. 15, whether it is justifiable under s. 1 as a reasonable limit on an equality right.

Reasoning of the Court
LaForest J wrote the majority, with Dickson and Gonthier JJ concurring. In the similar fashion from Dolphin Delivery, they looked at the meaning of section 32 to determine the purpose of the Charter, concluding it is a tool for checking the powers of the government over the individual. They further justified this conclusion by stating that if the scope were so widely read as to include private actions, it would impose too much a burden on the courts and would result in too much overlap with common law rules and statutes.

LaForest J's attention then moved to whether the University was a government body. The Public Purpose test alluded to in Dolphin Delivery is not determinative. The fact the school was created by statute and received a significant portion of its funding from government was insufficient. Nor was the fact it is regulated by government and fulfilled a public service sufficient. LaForest J noted that universities still function as autonomous bodies and the government had no direct power to control the school. Instead, the school is governed by a Board of Governors which is not the representative of government.

Despite the court ruling against the University's status as a government body, they nevertheless examined whether the retirement policy violated section 15. LaForest J stated that all actions pursuant to powers granted by law, not merely statutes, would be subject to Charter scrutiny.

The majority found that section 15 was violated because a distinction based on age discriminated against those who were old but capable of working. However, the violation was justified under section 1 due to the public necessity to have new teachers hired.
 
In a strong dissent, Wilson J (with Cory J concurring) examined a broad range of sources and proposed several tests including a "control test", "government function test" and a "government entity test". However, Wilson did not regard any of them as a panacea, since they all missed some aspect of government.

See also
 List of Supreme Court of Canada cases (Lamer Court)

External links
 
 case summary

Section Fifteen Charter case law
Supreme Court of Canada cases
Labour relations in Canada
1990 in Canadian case law
University of Guelph
Ageism case law